Anna Maria "Anke" Groot (born 1952) is a Dutch retired model and was Miss Europe of 1973.

Groot was the runner-up at Miss Holland 1973 in Roermond, Netherlands. She reached semi-finals at Miss World 1973 in London, where she won the Miss Photogenic special award. She won the 1973 Miss Europe title in Kitzbühel, Austria (the contest was postponed to January 1974).

In August 1974, she announced her retirement as a model and plans to open a bistro where she would become manager and hostess.

References

1952 births
Dutch beauty pageant winners
Dutch female models
Living people
Miss Europe winners
Miss World 1973 delegates